Cuerva is a municipality in Spain. Cuerva may also refer to
Gil Cuerva, Filipino-Spanish actor and model
Cryphia cuerva, a moth of the family Noctuidae